This is a list of settlements in the Cyclades islands, Greece. It is grouped by regional unit.

Andros

 Ammolochos
 Andros (town)
 Ano Gavrio
 Apoikia
 Aprovatou
 Arni
 Batsi
 Fellos
 Gavrio
 Kapparia
 Katakoilos
 Kochylos
 Korthio
 Lamyra
 Makrotantalo
 Mesaria
 Ormos Korthiou
 Palaiokastro
 Palaiopoli
 Pitrofos
 Stenies
 Syneti
 Vitali
 Vourkoti

Kea-Kythnos

 Dryopida
 Ioulis
 Korissia 
 Kythnos

Milos (regional unit)

 Adamantas
 Apollonia
 Artemonas
 Kimolos
 Milos
 Pera Triovasalos
 Serifos
 Triovasalos
 Trypiti

Mykonos

 Ano Mera
 Mykonos

Naxos (regional unit)

 Agios Arsenios
 Agios Prokopios
 Aigiali
 Amorgos
 Apeiranthos
 Arkesini
 Chalkeio
 Damarionas
 Danakos
 Donousa 
 Engares
 Filoti
 Galanado
 Galini
 Glynado
 Irakleia
 Katapola
 Keramoti
 Kinidaros
 Koronida
 Koronos
 Koufonisia
 Melanes
 Mesi
 Moni
 Naxos (city)
 Potamia
 Sagkri
 Schoinoussa
 Skado
 Tholaria
Vivlos
 Vroutsis

Paros (regional unit)

 Agkairia
 Antiparos
 Archilochos
 Kostos
 Lefkes
 Marpissa
 Naousa
 Paros

Syros

 Ano Syros
 Chrousa
 Ermoupoli
 Foinikas
 Galissas
 Manna
 Pagos
 Poseidonia
 Vari

Thira (regional unit)

 Akrotiri
 Anafi
 Ano Meria
 Emporeio
 Episkopi Gonias
 Exo Gonia
 Fira
 Folegandros
 Imerovigli
 Ios
 Karterados
 Megalochori
 Mesaria
 Oia
 Perissa
 Pyrgos Kallistis
 Sikinos
 Therasia
 Vothonas
 Vourvoulos

Tinos

 Agapi
 Dyo Choria
 Falatados
 Kalloni
 Kampos
 Kardiani
 Komi
 Ktikados
 Panormos
 Steni
 Tinos (town)
 Triantaros
 Ysternia

See also
List of towns and villages in Greece

Cyclades